The Abenaki (Abenaki: Wαpánahki) are an Indigenous peoples of the Northeastern Woodlands of Canada and the United States. They are an Algonquian-speaking people and part of the Wabanaki Confederacy. The Eastern  Abenaki language was predominantly spoken in Maine, while the Western Abenaki language was spoken in Quebec, Vermont, and New Hampshire.

While Abenaki peoples have shared cultural traits, they did not historically have a centralized government. They came together as a post-contact community after their original tribes were decimated by colonization, disease, and warfare.

Names

The word Abenaki and its syncope, Abnaki, are both derived from Wabanaki, or Wôbanakiak, meaning "People of the Dawn Land" in the Abenaki language. While the two terms are often confused, the Abenaki are one of several tribes in the Wabanaki Confederacy.

The name is spelled several ways including Abnaki, Abinaki, and Alnôbak.

Wôbanakiak is derived from wôban ("dawn" or "east") and aki ("land") (compare Proto-Algonquian *wa·pan and *axkyi) — the aboriginal name of the area broadly corresponding to New England and the Maritimes. It is sometimes used to refer to all the Algonquian-speaking peoples of the area—Western Abenaki, Eastern Abenaki, Wolastoqiyik-Passamaquoddy, and Miꞌkmaq—as a single group.

The Abenaki people also call themselves Alnôbak, meaning "Real People" (c.f., Lenape language: Lenapek) and by the autonym Alnanbal, meaning "men".

Historically, ethnologists have classified the Abenaki by geographic groups: Western Abenaki and Eastern Abenaki. Within these groups are the Abenaki bands:

Western Abenaki

 Arsigantegok (also Arrasaguntacook, Ersegontegog, Assagunticook, Anasaguntacook), lived along the St. Francis River in Québec. Principal village: St. Francis (Odanak). The people were referred to as St. Francis River Abenakis, and this term gradually was applied to all Western Abenaki.
 Cowasuck (also Cohass, Cohasiac, Koasek, Koasek, Coos – "People of the Pines"), lived in the upper Connecticut River Valley. Principal village: Cowass, near Newbury, Vermont.
 Missiquoi (also Masipskwoik, Mazipskikskoik, Missique, Misiskuoi, Missisco, Missiassik – "People of the Flint"), also known as the Sokoki. They lived in the Missisquoi Valley, from Lake Champlain to the headwaters. Principal village around Swanton, Vermont.
 Sokoki (also Sokwaki, Squakheag, Socoquis, Sokoquius, Zooquagese, Soquachjck, Onejagese – "People Who Separated"), lived in the Middle and Upper Connecticut River Valley. Principal villages: Squakheag, Northfield, Massachusetts, and Fort Hill.
 Pennacook (also Penacook, Penikoke, Openango), lived in the Merrimack Valley, therefore sometimes called Merrimack. Principal village Penacook, New Hampshire. The Pennacook were once a large confederacy who were politically distinct and competitive with their northern Abenaki neighbors.
Smaller tribes:
 Amoskeay
 Cocheco
 Nashua
 Ossipee, lived along the shores of Ossipee Lake in east-central New Hampshire. Often classed as Eastern Abenaki.
 Pemigewasset
 Piscataqua
 Souhegan
 Winnipesaukee (also Winnibisauga, Wioninebeseck, Winninebesakik – "region of the land around lakes"), lived along the shores of Lake Winnipesaukee, New Hampshire.

Wabanaki Nation

 Odanak (also known as Pierreville, MRC Nicolet-Yamaska), lived southwest of Trois-Rivières, Centre-du-Québec, and included settlements along the St. Francois River and Magog River.
 Wôlinak (also Becancour, MRC Becancour), lived around Trois-Rivières, Centre-du-Québec, and included settlements along the Bécancour River.

Eastern Abenaki

 Androscoggin (also Alessikantekw, Arosaguntacock, Amariscoggin), lived in the Androscoggin Valley and along the St. Francis River, therefore often called St. Francis River Abenaki.
 Kennebec (also Kinipekw, Kennebeck, Caniba, later known as Norridgewock), lived in the Kennebec River Valley in northern Maine. Principal village: Norridgewock (Naridgewalk, Neridgewok, Noronjawoke); other villages: Amaseconti (Amesokanti, Anmissoukanti), Kennebec, and Sagadahoc.
 Penobscot (also Panawahpskek, Pamnaouamske, Pentagouet), lived in the Penobscot Valley. Principal villages: Penobscot (Pentagouet), now Indian Island, Old Town, Maine; other villages: Agguncia, Asnela, Catawamtek, Kenduskeag, Mattawamkeag, Meecombe, Negas, Olamon, Passadumkeag, Precaute, Segocket, and Wabigganus. Now a separate federally recognized tribe.
 Pequawket (also Pigwacket, Pequaki), lived along the Saco River and in the White Mountains. Principal village Pigwacket was located on the upper Saco River near present-day Fryeburg, Maine. Occupied an intermediate location, therefore sometimes classed as Western Abenaki.
Smaller tribes:
 Apikwahki
 Amaseconti, lived between the upper Kennebec and Androscoggin rivers in western Maine.
 Kwupahag (also Kwapahag)
 Ossipee, lived along the shores of Ossipee Lake in east-central New Hampshire. Sometimes classed as Western Abenaki.
 Rocameca, lived along the upper Androscoggin River, near Canton, Maine.
 Wawinak (also Ouanwinak, Sheepscot, Wawenock, Wawnock, Wewenoc), lived in the coastal areas of southern Maine.
Maliseet and Passamaquoddy:
  Maliseet (also Wolastoqiyik, Walastekwyk, Malecite), lived in the inland of upper Maine and middle New Brunswick along the St. John River. Principal villages: Meductic, Aukpaque. Now a separate federally recognized tribe.
 Passamaquoddy (also Peskotomuhktati, Pestomuhkati), lived on the Passamaquoddy Bay coast and inland, between the St. John, St. Croix and Penobscot rivers, in present-day Maine and New Brunswick. Principal village: Machias. Now a separate federally recognized tribe.

Location

The homeland of the Abenaki, which they call Ndakinna (Our Land), extended across most of what is now northern New England, southern Quebec, and the southern Canadian Maritimes. The Eastern Abenaki population was concentrated in portions of New Brunswick and Maine east of New Hampshire's White Mountains. The other major tribe, the Western Abenaki, lived in the Connecticut River valley in Vermont, New Hampshire, and Massachusetts. The Missiquoi lived along the eastern shore of Lake Champlain. The Pennacook lived along the Merrimack River in southern New Hampshire. The maritime Abenaki lived around the St. Croix and Wolastoq (Saint John River) valleys near the boundary line between Maine and New Brunswick.

English colonial settlement in New England and frequent conflicts led many Abenaki to migrate to Quebec. The Abenaki settled in the Sillery region of Quebec between 1676 and 1680, and subsequently, for about twenty years, lived on the banks of the Chaudière River near the falls, before settling in Odanak and Wôlinak in the early eighteenth century.

In those days, the Abenaki practiced a subsistence economy based on hunting, fishing, trapping, berry picking and on growing corn, beans, squash, potatoes and tobacco. They also produced baskets, made of ash and sweet grass, for picking wild berries, and boiled maple sap to make syrup. Basket weaving remains a traditional activity for members of both communities.

During the Anglo-French wars, the Abenaki were allies of France, having been displaced from Ndakinna by immigrating English settlers. An anecdote from the period tells the story of a Maliseet war chief named Nescambuit or Assacumbuit, who killed more than 140 enemies of King Louis XIV of France and received the rank of knight. Not all Abenaki natives fought on the side of the French, however; many remained on their native lands in the northern colonies. Much of the trapping was done by the people and traded to the English colonists for durable goods. These contributions by Native American Abenaki peoples went largely unreported.
Two tribal communities formed in Canada, one once known as Saint-Francois-du-lac near Pierreville, Quebec (now called Odanak, Abenaki for "coming home"), and the other near Bécancour (now known as Wôlinak) on the south shore of the Saint Lawrence River, directly across the river from Trois-Rivières. These two Abenaki reserves continue to grow and develop. Since the year 2000, the total Abenaki population (on and off reserve) has doubled to 2,101 members in 2011. The unrecognized majority are off-reserve members, living in various cities and towns across Canada and the United States.

There are about 3,200 Abenaki living in Vermont and New Hampshire, without reservations, chiefly around Lake Champlain. The remaining Abenaki people live in multi-racial towns and cities across Canada and the US, mainly in Ontario, Quebec, New Brunswick, and northern New England.

In December 2012, the Nulhegan Band of the Coosuk Abenaki Nation created a tribal forest in the town of Barton, Vermont. This forest was established with assistance from the Vermont Sierra Club and the Vermont Land Trust. It contains a hunting camp and maple sugaring facilities that are administered cooperatively by the Nulhegan. The forest contains . The Missiquoi Abenaki Tribe owns forest land in the town of Brunswick, Vermont, centered around the Brunswick Springs. These springs are believed to be a sacred Abenaki site.

Language

The Abenaki language is closely related to the Panawahpskek (Penobscot) language. Other neighboring Wabanaki tribes, the Pestomuhkati (Passamaquoddy), Wolastoqiyik (Maliseet), and Miꞌkmaq, and other Eastern Algonquian languages share many linguistic similarities. It has come close to extinction as a spoken language. Tribal members are working to revive the Abenaki language at Odanak (means "in the village"), a First Nations Abenaki reserve near Pierreville, Quebec, and throughout New Hampshire, Vermont, and New York state.

The language is polysynthetic, meaning that a phrase or an entire sentence is expressed by a single word. For example, the word for "white man" awanoch is a combination of the words awani meaning "who" and uji meaning "from". Thus, the word for "white man" literally translates to "Who is this man and where does he come from?"

History

In Reflections in Bullough's Pond, historian Diana Muir argues that the Abenakis' neighbors, pre-contact Iroquois, were an imperialist, expansionist culture whose cultivation of the corn/beans/squash agricultural complex enabled them to support a large population. They made war primarily against neighboring Algonquian peoples, including the Abenaki. Muir uses archaeological data to argue that the Iroquois expansion onto Algonquian lands was checked by the Algonquian adoption of agriculture. This enabled them to support their own populations large enough to have sufficient warriors to defend against the threat of Iroquois conquest.

In 1614, Thomas Hunt captured 24 Abenaki people and took them to Spain, where they were sold into slavery. During the European colonization of North America, the land occupied by the Abenaki was in the area between the new colonies of England in Massachusetts and the French in Quebec. Since no party agreed to territorial boundaries, there was regular conflict among them. The Abenaki were traditionally allied with the French; during the reign of Louis XIV, Chief Assacumbuit was designated a member of the French nobility for his service.

Around 1669, the Abenaki started to emigrate to Quebec due to conflicts with English colonists and epidemics of new infectious diseases. The governor of New France allocated two seigneuries (large self-administered areas similar to feudal fiefs). The first was on the Saint Francis River and is now known as the Odanak Indian Reservation; the second was founded near Bécancour and is called the Wolinak Indian Reservation.

Abenaki wars

When the Wampanoag people under King Philip (Metacomet) fought the English colonists in New England in 1675 in King Philip's War, the Abenaki joined the Wampanoag. For three years they fought along the Maine frontier in the First Abenaki War. The Abenaki pushed back the line of white settlement through devastating raids on scattered farmhouses and small villages. The war was settled by a peace treaty in 1678, with the Wampanoag more than decimated and many Native survivors having been sold into slavery in Bermuda.

During Queen Anne's War in 1702, the Abenaki were allied with the French; they raided numerous English colonial settlements in Maine, from Wells to Casco, killing about 300 settlers over ten years. They also occasionally raided into Massachusetts, for instance in Groton and Deerfield in 1704. The raids stopped when the war ended. Some captives were adopted into the Mohawk and Abenaki tribes; older captives were generally ransomed, and the colonies carried on a brisk trade.

The Third Abenaki War (1722–25), called Father Rale's War, erupted when the French Jesuit missionary Sébastien Rale (or Rasles, ~1657?-1724) encouraged the Abenaki to halt the spread of Yankee settlements. When the Massachusetts militia tried to seize Rale, the Abenaki raided the settlements at Brunswick, Arrowsick, and Merry-Meeting Bay. The Massachusetts government then declared war and bloody battles were fought at Norridgewock (1724), where Rale was killed, and at a daylong battle at the Indian village near present-day Fryeburg, Maine, on the upper Saco River (1725). Peace conferences at Boston and Casco Bay brought an end to the war. After Rale died the Abenaki moved to a settlement on the St. Francis River.

The Abenaki from St. Francois continued to raid British settlements in their former homelands along the New England frontier during Father Le Loutre's War (see Northeast Coast Campaign (1750)) and the French and Indian War.

Canada

The development of tourism projects has allowed the Canadian Abenaki to develop a modern economy, while preserving their culture and traditions. For example, since 1960, the Odanak Historical Society has managed the first and one of the largest aboriginal museums in Quebec, a few miles from the Quebec-Montreal axis. Over 5,000 people visit the Abenaki Museum annually. Several Abenaki companies include: in Wôlinak, General Fiberglass Engineering employs a dozen natives, with annual sales exceeding C$3 million. Odanak is now active in transportation and distribution. Notable Abenaki from this area include the documentary filmmaker Alanis Obomsawin (National Film Board of Canada).

United States

Maine: federally recognized tribes 

The Penobscot Indian Nation, Passamaquoddy people, and Houlton Band of Maliseet Indians have been federally recognized as tribes in the United States.

Vermont: state-recognized tribes

Nulhegan Band of the Coosuk Abenaki Nation, Koasek Abenaki Tribe, Elnu Abenaki Tribe, and the Missiquoi Abenaki Tribe are all state-recognized tribes in the United States, all in the state of Vermont.

Recognition allows applicants to seek certain scholarship funds reserved for American Indians and to for members to market artwork as American Indian or Native American-made under the 1990 Indian Arts and Crafts Act.

In 2002, the State of Vermont reported that the Abenaki people had migrated north to Quebec by the end of the 17th century. Facing annihilation, many Abenaki had begun emigrating to Canada, then under French control, around 1669. The Odanak band of the Abenaki First Nation, denounced any groups claiming to be Abenaki in the United States.

New Hampshire and minority recognition

New Hampshire does not recognize any Abenaki tribes. It has no federally recognized tribes or state-recognized tribes; however, it established the New Hampshire Commission on Native American Affairs in 2010.

In 2021, a bill was introduced to the New Hampshire legislature to allow New Hampshire communities to rename locations in the Abenaki language. This bill did not pass.

Culture

There are a dozen variations of the name "Abenaki", such as Abenaquiois, Abakivis, Quabenakionek, Wabenakies and others.

The Abenaki were described in the Jesuit Relations as not cannibals, and as docile, ingenious, temperate in the use of liquor, and not profane.

Abenaki lifeways were similar to those of Algonquian-speaking peoples of southern New England. They cultivated food crops and built villages on or near fertile river floodplains. They also hunted game, fished, and gathered wild plants and fungi.

Unlike the Haudenosaunee, the Abenaki were patrilineal. Each man had different hunting territories inherited through his father. 

Most of the year, Abenaki lived in dispersed bands of extended families. Bands came together during the spring and summer at seasonal villages near rivers, or somewhere along the seacoast for planting and fishing. During the winter, the Abenaki lived in small groups further inland. These villages occasionally had to be fortified, depending on the alliances and enemies of other tribes or of Europeans near the village. Abenaki villages were quite small with an average number of 100 residents.

Most Abenaki crafted dome-shaped, bark-covered wigwams for housing, though a few preferred oval-shaped longhouses. During the winter, the Abenaki lined the inside of their conical wigwams with bear and deer skins for warmth.

Gender, food, division of labor, and other cultural traits

The Abenaki were a farming society that supplemented agriculture with hunting and gathering. Generally the men were the hunters. The women tended the fields and grew the crops. In their fields, they planted the crops in groups of "sisters". The three sisters were grown together: the stalk of corn supported the beans, and squash or pumpkins provided ground cover and reduced weeds. The men would hunt bears, deer, fish, and birds.

The Abenaki were a patrilineal society, which was common among New England tribes. In this they differed from the six Iroquois tribes to the west in New York, and from many other North American Native tribes who had matrilineal societies. 

Groups used the consensus method to make important decisions.

Storytelling

Storytelling is a major part of Abenaki culture. It is used not only as entertainment but also as a teaching method. The Abenaki view stories as having lives of their own and being aware of how they are used. Stories were used as a means of teaching children behavior. Children were not to be mistreated, and so instead of punishing the child, they would be told a story.

One of the stories is of Azban the Raccoon. This is a story about a proud raccoon that challenges a waterfall to a shouting contest. When the waterfall does not respond, Azban dives into the waterfall to try to outshout it; he is swept away because of his pride. This story would be used to show a child the pitfalls of pride.

Mythology

Ethnobotany

The Abenaki smash the flowers and leaves of Ranunculus acris and sniff them for headaches. They consume the fruit of Vaccinium myrtilloides as part of their traditional diet. They also use the fruit and the grains of Viburnum nudum var. cassinoides for food.

Many other plants are used for various healing and treatment modalities, including for the skin, as a disinfectant, as a cure-all, as a respiratory aid, for colds, coughs, fevers, grippe, gas, blood strengthening, headaches and other pains, rheumatism, demulcent, nasal inflammation, anthelmintic, for the eyes, abortifacent, for the bones, antihemorrhagic, as a sedative, anaphrodisiac, swellings, urinary aid, gastrointestinal aid, as a hemostat, pediatric aid (such as for teething), and other unspecified or general uses.

They use Hierochloe odorata (sweetgrass), Apocynum (dogbane), Betula papyrifera (paper birch), Fraxinus americana (white ash), Fraxinus nigra (black ash), Laportea canadensis (Canada nettle), a variety of Salix species, and Tilia americana (basswood, or American linden) var. americana for making baskets, canoes, snowshoes, and whistles. They use Hierochloe odorata and willow to make containers, Betula papyrifera to create containers, moose calls and other utilitarian pieces, and the bark of Cornus sericea (red osier dogwood) ssp. sericea for smoking.

They also use Acer rubrum, Acornus calamus, an unknown Amelanchier species, Caltha palustris, Cardamine diphylla, Cornus canadensis, an unknown Crataegus species, Fragaria virginiana, Gaultheria procumbens, Osmunda cinnamomea, Phaseolus vulgaris, Photinia melanocarpa, Prunus virginiana, Rubus idaeus and another unknown Rubus species, Solanum tuberosum, Spiraea alba var. latifolia, Vaccinium angustifolium, and Zea mays as a tea, soup, jelly, sweetener, condiment, snack, or meal.
The Abenaki use the gum of Abies balsamea for slight itches and as an antiseptic ointment. They stuff the leaves, needles and wood into pillows as a panacea.

Population and epidemics

Before the Abenaki, except the Pennacook and Miꞌkmaq, had contact with the European world, their population may have numbered as many as 40,000. Around 20,000 would have been Eastern Abenaki, another 10,000 would have been Western Abenaki, and the last 10,000 would have been Maritime Abenaki. Early contact with European fishermen resulted in two major epidemics that affected Abenaki during the 16th century. The first epidemic was an unknown sickness occurring sometime between 1564 and 1570, and the second one was typhus in 1586. Multiple epidemics arrived a decade prior to the English colonization of Massachusetts in 1620, when three separate sicknesses swept across New England and the Canadian Maritimes. Maine was hit very hard during the year of 1617, with a fatality rate of 75%, and the population of the Eastern Abenaki fell to about 5,000. The more isolated Western Abenaki suffered fewer fatalities, losing about half of their original population of 10,000.

The new diseases continued to strike in epidemics, starting with smallpox in 1631, 1633, and 1639. Seven years later, an unknown epidemic struck, with influenza passing through the following year. Smallpox affected the Abenaki again in 1649, and diphtheria came through 10 years later. Smallpox struck in 1670, and influenza in 1675. Smallpox affected the Native Americans in 1677, 1679, 1687, along with measles, 1691, 1729, 1733, 1755, and finally in 1758.

The Abenaki population continued to decline, but in 1676, they took in thousands of refugees from many southern New England tribes displaced by settlement and King Philip's War. Because of this, descendants of nearly every southern New England Algonquian tribe can be found among the Abenaki people. A century later, fewer than 1,000 Abenaki remained after the American Revolution.

In the 1990 U.S. Census, 1,549 people identified themselves as Abenaki. So did 2,544 people in the 2000 U.S census, with 6,012 people claiming Abenaki heritage. In 1991 Canadian Abenaki numbered 945; by 2006 they numbered 2,164.

Fiction

Lydia Maria Child wrote of the Abenaki in her short story, "The Church in the Wilderness" (1828). Several Abenaki characters and much about their 18th-century culture are featured in the Kenneth Roberts novel Arundel (1930). The film Northwest Passage (1940) is based on a novel of the same name by Roberts.

The Abenaki are featured in Charles McCarry's historical novel Bride of the Wilderness (1988), and James Archibald Houston's novel Ghost Fox (1977), both of which are set in the eighteenth century; and in Jodi Picoult's Second Glance (2003) and Lone Wolf (2012) novels, set in the contemporary world. Books for younger readers both have historical settings: Joseph Bruchac's The Arrow Over the Door (1998) (grades 4–6) is set in 1777; and Beth Kanell's young adult novel, The Darkness Under the Water (2008), concerns a young Abenaki-French Canadian girl during the time of the Vermont Eugenics Project, 1931–1936.

The first sentence in Norman Mailer's novel Harlot's Ghost makes reference to the Abenaki: "On a late-winter evening in 1983, while driving through fog along the Maine coast, recollections of old campfires began to drift into the March mist, and I thought of the Abnaki Indians of the Algonquin tribe who dwelt near Bangor a thousand years ago."

Non-fiction

Letters and other non-fiction writing can be found in the anthology Dawnland Voices. Selections include letters from leader of the early praying town, Wamesit in Massachusetts Samuel Numphow, Sagamore Kancamagus, and writings on the Abenaki language by former chief of the reserve at Odanak in Quebec, Joseph Laurent as well as many others.

Accounts of life with the Abenaki can be found in the captivity narratives written by women taken captive by the Abenaki from the early New England settlements: Mary Rowlandson (1682), Hannah Duston (1702); Elizabeth Hanson (1728); Susannah Willard Johnson (1754); and Jemima Howe (1792).

Maps

Maps showing the approximate locations of areas occupied by members of the Wabanaki Confederacy (from north to south):

Notable historic Abenaki people

Please list living people under their First Nation or state-recognized tribe.
 Indian Joe (–1819), an 18th-century Mi'kmaw scout, adopted by the Abenaki
 Joseph Laurent (1839–1917), chief, author, language advocate, businessman
 Henry Lorne Masta (1853–1943), chief, language advocate, and author
Elijah Tahamont (1855–1918), silent film actor Dark Cloud

See also
Mount Pemigewasset

Footnotes

Bibliography

 Aubery, Joseph Fr. and Stephen Laurent, 1995. Father Aubery's French Abenaki Dictionary: English translation. S. Laurent (Translator). Chisholm Bros. Publishing
 Baker, C. Alice, 1897. True Stories of New England Captives Carried to Canada during the Old French and Indian Wars. Press of E.A. Hall & Company, Greenfield, Massachusetts
 Charland, Thomas-M. (O.P.), 1964. Les Abenakis D'Odanak: Histoire des Abénakis D'Odanak (1675–1937). Les Éditions du Lévrier, Montreal, QC
 Coleman, Emma Lewis. New England Captives Carried to Canada: Between 1677 and 1760 During the French and Indian Wars, Heritage Books, 1989 (reprint 1925).
 Day, Gordon, 1981. The Identity of the Saint Francis Indians, National Museums of Canada, Ottawa, National Museum Of Man Mercury Series , Canadian Ethnology Service Paper No. 71 .
  Reprinted (paperback) Sept. 2006: Vancouver: Global Language Press], ; Dec. 2009 (hardcover): Kessinger Publishings Legacy Reprint Series; and April 2010 (paperback): Nabu Press.
 Masta, Henry Lorne, 1932. Abenaki Legends, Grammar and Place Names. Victoriaville, PQ: La Voix Des Bois-Franes. Reprinted 2008: Toronto: Global Language Press, 
 Maurault, Joseph-Anselme (Abbot), 1866. Histoire des Abénakis, depuis 1605 jusqu'à nos jours. Published at L'Atelier typographique de la "Gazette de Sorel", QC
 Moondancer and Strong Woman, 2007. A Cultural History of the Native Peoples of Southern New England: Voices from Past and Present. Boulder, CO: Bauu Press,

Further reading

Other grammar books and dictionaries include:
 Dr. Gordon M. Day's two-volume Western Abenaki Dictionary (August 1994), Paperback: 616 pages, Publisher: Canadian Museum Of Civilization
 Chief Henry Lorne Masta's Abenaki Legends, Grammar, and Place Names (1932), Odanak, Quebec, reprinted in 2008 by Global Language Press
 Joseph Aubery's Father Aubery's French-Abenaki Dictionary (1700), translated into English-Abenaki by Stephen Laurent, and published in hardcover (525 pp.) by Chisholm Bros. Publishing.

External links

 Penobscot Nation, Maine 
 Conseil des Abénakis d'Odanak, Quebec
 Abenaki (Wôbanakiôdwawôgan), Omniglot
 Missisquoi Abenaki Tribal Council

 Koasek Traditional Band of the Koas Abenaki Nation
 Nulhegan Abenaki Tribe
 Elnu Tribe of the Abenaki
 Native Languages of the Americas: Abnaki-Penobscot (Abenaki Language) 
 Abenaki language – recordings
 Western Abenaki Dictionary and Radio Online

 
Algonquian ethnonyms
Algonquian peoples
First Nations in Atlantic Canada
Indigenous peoples of the Northeastern Woodlands
Native American history of Maine
Native American tribes in Maine
Native American tribes in Vermont
First Nations in Quebec
State-recognized tribes in the United States
Wabanaki Confederacy